Galen R. Clagett (born February 9, 1942) is an American politician from Maryland and a member of the Democratic Party. He served three terms in the Maryland House of Delegates, representing Maryland's District 3A in Frederick County. During his tenure he was a member of the Appropriations Committee.

Early life
Galen Ronald Clagett was born in Brunswick, Maryland on February 9, 1942. He attended Frostburg State University before becoming a real estate agent and President of the property management firm Clagett Enterprises, Inc.

Legislative notes
 voted for the Clean Indoor Air Act of 2007 (HB359)
 voted in favor of increasing the sales tax whilst simultaneously reducing income tax rates for some income brackets - Tax Reform Act of 2007(HB2)
 voted to support in-state tuition for all graduates of a Maryland public high school, 2007(HB6)
 voted for the Maryland Gang Prosecution Act of 2007 (HB713), subjecting gang members to up to 20 years in prison and/or a fine of up to $100,000 
 voted for Jessica's Law (HB 930), eliminating parole for the most violent child sexual predators and creating a mandatory minimum sentence of 25 years in state prison, 2007 
 voted for Public Safety – Statewide DNA Database System – Crimes of Violence and Burglary – Post conviction (HB 370), helping to give police officers and prosecutors greater resources to solve crimes and eliminating a backlog of 24,000 unanalyzed DNA samples, leading to 192 arrests, 2008 
 voted for Vehicle Laws – Repeated Drunk and Drugged Driving Offenses – Suspension of License (HB 293), strengthening Maryland's drunk driving laws by imposing a mandatory one year license suspension for a person convicted of drunk driving more than once in five years, 2009 
 voted for HB 102, creating the House Emergency Medical Services System Workgroup, leading to Maryland's budgeting of $52 million to fund three new Medevac helicopters to replace the State's aging fleet, 2009 
voted to raise income taxes on single filers earning more than $100,000 and joint filers earning more than $150,000, 2012

Election results
 2006 Race for Maryland House of Delegates – District 3A
Voters to choose two:
{| class="wikitable"
|-
!Name
!Votes
!Percent
!Outcome
|-
|-
|Galen R. Clagett, Dem.
|12,422
|  25.7%
|   Won
|-
|-
|Sue Hecht, Dem.
|13,900
|  28.7%
|   Won
|-
|-
|Patrick N. Hogan, Rep.
|12,163
|  25.1%
|   Lost
|-
|-
|Linda Naylor, Rep.
|9,873
|  20.4%
|   Lost
|-
|Other Write-Ins
|32
|  0.1%
|   Lost
|-
|}

 2002 Race for Maryland House of Delegates – District 3A
Voters to choose two:
{| class="wikitable"
|-
!Name
!Votes
!Percent
!Outcome
|-
|-
|Patrick N. Hogan, Rep.
|12,066
|  26.4%
|   Won
|-
|-
|Galen R. Clagett, Dem.
|11,434
|  25.0%
|   Won
|-
|-
|Dick Zimmerman, Dem.
|11,288
|  24.7%
|   Lost
|-
|-
|Timothy W. Brooks, Rep.
|10,782
|  23.6%
|   Lost
|-
|Other Write-Ins
|168
|  0.4%
|   Lost
|-
|-
|Ron Bird, Dem.
|4
|  0.0%
|   Lost
|}

References

1942 births
Living people
People from Brunswick, Maryland
Frostburg State University alumni
Democratic Party members of the Maryland House of Delegates
Politicians from Frederick, Maryland
21st-century American politicians